Ivargal Varungala Thoongal is a 1987 Indian Tamil-language film written and directed by Venkat. The film stars Prabhu and Ambika. It was released on 21 October 1987.

Plot

Cast 
Prabhu
Ambika
Raghuvaran
Jaishankar
Jayachitra
Ravichandran
Nagesh
Disco Shanti

Production 
Ivargal Varungala Thoongal is Prabhu's 50th film as an actor.

Soundtrack 
The soundtrack was composed by T. Rajendar.

Reception 
N. Krishnasamy of The Indian Express wrote, "Its partly a sermon, partly a feekless pack-up, mostly a letdown".

References

External links 
 

1980 films
1980s Tamil-language films
1987 films
Films scored by T. Rajendar